Alnus alnobetula is a common tree widespread across much of Europe, Asia, and North America. Many sources refer to it as Alnus viridis, the green alder, but botanically this is considered an illegitimate name synonymous with Alnus alnobetula subsp. fruticosa.

Description

The flowers are catkins, appearing late in spring after the leaves emerge (unlike other alders which flower before leafing out); the male catkins are pendulous, 4–8 cm long, the female catkins 1 cm long and 0.7 cm broad when mature in late autumn, in clusters of 3–10 on a branched stem.

The roots of Alnus viridis subsp. sinuata have nitrogen-fixing nodules. A study in Alaska showed that Sitka alder seedlings were able to invade coal mine spoils and can be used for revegetation and stripmine reclamation.

Distribution
There are four to six subspecies, some treated as separate species by some authors:
Alnus viridis subsp. viridis – Central Europe
Alnus viridis subsp. suaveolens – Corsica (endemic)
Alnus viridis subsp. fruticosa – Northeast Europe, northern Asia, northwestern North America
Alnus viridis subsp. maximowiczii (A. maximowiczii) – Japan
Alnus viridis subsp. crispa (A. crispa, mountain alder) – northeastern North America, Greenland
Alnus viridis subsp. sinuata (A. sinuata, Sitka alder or slide alder) – western North America, far northeastern Siberia

Alnus viridis is classed as an environmental weed in New Zealand.

Ecology
Alnus viridis has a shallow root system, and is marked not only by vigorous production of stump suckers, but also by root suckers.

Alnus viridis is a light-demanding, fast-growing shrub that grows well on poorer soils. In many areas, it is a highly characteristic colonist of avalanche chutes in mountains, where potentially competing larger trees are killed by regular avalanche damage. A. viridis survives the avalanches through its ability to re-grow from the roots and broken stumps. Unlike some other alders, it does require moist soil, and is a colonist of screes and shallow stony slopes. It also commonly grows on subarctic river gravels, particularly in northern Siberia, Alaska and Canada, occupying areas similarly disrupted by ice floes during spring river ice breakup; in this habitat it commonly occurs mixed with shrubby willows.

Uses
It is sometimes used for afforestation on infertile soils which it enriches by means of its nitrogen-fixing nodules, while not growing large enough to compete with the intended timber crop. A. sinuata can add 20 kg of nitrogen per acre (50kg/hectare) per year to the soil. Alnus viridis leaves have been used in the traditional Austrian medicine externally or internally as tea for treatment of infections and fever.

References

External links
 Alnus viridis - information, genetic conservation units and related resources. European Forest Genetic Resources Programme (EUFORGEN)

alnobetula
Trees of North America
Trees of Europe
Trees of Asia
Flora of the Alps
Flora of the Carpathians